José Ignacio 'Natxo' González Sáenz (born 29 July 1966) is a Spanish football manager and former player who played as a midfielder.

After a brief playing career as an amateur, he began coaching and led Alavés to the Segunda División in 2013, where he also led Reus, Zaragoza, Deportivo La Coruña and Málaga. Abroad, he had brief spells in the top leagues of Portugal and Bolivia.

Football career
González finished his football career at the age of 20, after only playing amateur football. After starting out as a manager at the same level he took charge of Deportivo Alavés' youth setup in 1994, being promoted to the B-team in 1997.

In 2004, after a year in the club's board, González was appointed at CF Reus Deportiu, being promoted to Segunda División B at the end of the 2004–05 campaign. In his only season in the third tier the Catalans finished 17th, being relegated back to Tercera División in the last matchday.

In June 2007, González signed with UE Sant Andreu, also in Catalonia and the fourth division. He achieved promotion at the first attempt and, four years later, was relieved of his duties due to financial problems.

On 14 June 2012, after nearly a year away from club duty, González was appointed Deportivo Alavés' manager, being promoted to Segunda División at the end of the season. He renewed his contract on 7 June 2013, eventually appearing in his first professional match on 16 August, a 0–1 away defeat against Girona FC.

González was sacked on 3 December 2013, with the club second from bottom in Segunda División. On 1 June of the following year he returned to Reus, now in the third level.

On 8 June 2015, González renewed with Reus for a further year. During the 2015–16 campaign, he led the club to the round of 32 of Copa del Rey, being knocked out by Atlético Madrid, and also reached the promotion play-offs after Reus finished first in its group; in the play-offs, the club defeated Racing de Santander in a 4–0 win on aggregate, and achieved promotion to the second level for the first time ever.

González signed a two-year contract with fellow second tier club Real Zaragoza on 11 June 2017. He later resigned on 11 June 2018, after failing to achieve promotion to La Liga losing 3–2 on aggregate to CD Numancia in the play-offs.

On 15 June 2018, González was named Deportivo de La Coruña manager, also in the second division. He was sacked the following 7 April, following a 0–2 home loss against CF Rayo Majadahonda.

González moved abroad for the first time when was appointed as manager of C.D. Tondela in the Portuguese Primeira Liga on 14 June 2019. He succeeded Pepa in the role. After keeping the club in the top flight on the last day of the season with a win at Moreirense FC, he resigned a year early on 5 August 2020.

On 12 December 2020, González was named manager of Bolivian club Bolívar. The following 23 May, after the club's elimination from the 2021 Copa Sudamericana, he was sacked.

On 27 January 2022, González was named manager of Málaga CF back in his home country. He was dismissed on 2 April, after only one win in ten matches.

Managerial statistics

References

External links

1966 births
Living people
Footballers from Vitoria-Gasteiz
Spanish footballers
Association football midfielders
Divisiones Regionales de Fútbol players
Spanish football managers
Segunda División managers
Primeira Liga managers
Bolivian Primera División managers
CF Reus Deportiu managers
UE Sant Andreu managers
Deportivo Alavés managers
Real Zaragoza managers
Deportivo de La Coruña managers
Málaga CF managers
UD Logroñés managers
C.D. Tondela managers
Club Bolívar managers
Spanish expatriate football managers
Expatriate football managers in Portugal
Expatriate football managers in Bolivia
Spanish expatriate sportspeople in Portugal
Spanish expatriate sportspeople in Bolivia